Pimmalione (Pygmalion) is an opera in one act by Luigi Cherubini, first performed at the Théâtre des Tuileries, Paris, on 30 November 1809. The libretto is an adaptation by Stefano Vestris of Antonio Simone Sografi's Italian translation of the text Jean-Jacques Rousseau wrote for his scène lyrique Pygmalion (1770). It is based on the Classical legend of the sculptor Pygmalion. 

Cherubini, beset by severe depression, financial difficulties, and the hostility of Napoleon, was persuaded to write the one-act opera by two of the Emperor's favourite singers, the famous castrato Girolamo Crescentini and the contralto Giuseppina Grassini (who had been Napoleon's lover), who believed that this might be a way for the composer to regain Napoleon's regard. It was first given in a private performance at the emperor's palace, Les Tuileries. Napoleon was delighted with the work and offered Cherubini a large reward and a commission for another piece.

Roles

Synopsis
The sculptor Pygmalion falls in love with his own work, a statue of Galatea. He prays to the gods of love Venus and Cupid to release him from his passion. While he sleeps, Galatea's statue comes to life, dances and falls in love with Pygmalion. Pygmalion and Galatea celebrate their wedding in the palace of Venus.

References
Notes

Sources
  Carli Ballola, Giovanni, Cherubini: L'uomo. La musica, Milan, Bompiani, 2015, .
 Deane, Basil, Cherubini, New York, Oxford University Press, 1965
  Mellace, Raffaele, Pimmalione, in Piero Gelli (ed), Dizionario dell'opera 2008, Milan, Baldini Castoldi Dalai, 2007, pp. 1021-1022,  (the article is reproduced at Opera Manager)

Operas
Operas set in Cyprus
Operas by Luigi Cherubini
Italian-language operas
One-act operas
1809 operas
Operas based on Metamorphoses
Works based on Pygmalion from Ovid's Metamorphoses